Thomas or Tom Graves may refer to:

 Captain Thomas Graves (c. 1580–1635), English planter in colonial Virginia
 Thomas Graves (engineer) (c. 1585–1662), English engineer who laid out Charlestown, Boston, Massachusetts in 1629
 Thomas Graves, 1st Baron Graves (1725–1802), British naval officer, colonial official, peer
 Thomas Graves (judge) (1684–1747), associate justice of the Massachusetts Supreme Judicial Court
 Thomas Graves (naturalist) (1805–1856), British naval officer and naturalist
 Thomas Graves (priest) (1745–1828), Irish priest, Dean of Ardfert, Dean of Connor
 Thomas Graves (Royal Navy officer) (c. 1747–1814), Irish naval officer and cousin of 1st Baron Graves
 Thomas Graves, 2nd Baron Graves (1775–1830), Irish peer and politician
 Thomas Ashley Graves Jr. (1924–2016), American educational executive
 Thomas J. Graves (1866–1944), American soldier
 Tom Graves (born 1970), American politician
 Tom Graves (American football) (born 1955), American football player
 Tom Graves (writer) (born 1954), American journalist, nonfiction writer, and novelist
 Tomás Graves (born 1953), English-Spanish graphic designer, printer, musician, writer, son of Robert Graves
 Thomas Graves Law (1836–1904), English priest, historian, bibliographer, descendant of 2nd Baron Graves
 Thomas Graves Meredith (1853–1945), Canadian lawyer